Kurt Leuenberger (15 November 1933 – 2000) was a Swiss footballer. He played in five matches for the Switzerland national football team from 1957 to 1960.

References

External links
 

1933 births
2000 deaths
Swiss men's footballers
Switzerland international footballers
Place of birth missing
Association footballers not categorized by position